"Unforgiven" is a song recorded by American country music artist Tracy Lawrence.  It was released in March 2001 as the third single from the album Lessons Learned.  The song reached #35 on the Billboard Hot Country Singles & Tracks chart.  The song was written by Larry Boone, Bobby Pinson and Paul Nelson.

Chart performance

References

2001 singles
2000 songs
Tracy Lawrence songs
Songs written by Larry Boone
Songs written by Paul Nelson (songwriter)
Songs written by Bobby Pinson
Atlantic Records singles